Democratic League is a name used by political parties, alliances and organizations in several countries, such as:
China Democratic League
Christian Democratic League of Women
Community Democratic League
Democratic League (Catalonia)
Democratic League/Movement for the Labour Party
Democratic League in Montenegro
Democratic League of Bosniaks
Democratic League of Dardania
Democratic League of Kosovo
Ethiopian Democratic League
Ethiopian Somali Democratic League
Florida Democratic League
Free-thinking Democratic League
Finnish People's Democratic League
Islamic Democratic League
Kayah Democratic League
National Democratic League
Serb Democratic League
Social Democratic League
Social Democratic League of America